The Dodge Custom 880 is an automobile that was marketed by Dodge from 1962 through the end of the 1965 model year. It was to fill Dodge's product offer in the mid-price full-size market segment, as well as to help fill the void in Chrysler's lineup left by the discontinuation of DeSoto in 1961.

Origins
The Custom 880 was developed to fill consumer demand for a full-size Dodge passenger car during the 1962 model year.
 
Chrysler's president overheard and misunderstood Chevrolet chief Ed Cole to have said Chevrolet's largest cars would be downsized for 1962. Chrysler designers were forced to take the planned 1962 Dodge full-size line and shorten the design to fit a more compact wheelbase in a last-minute effort to compete with what was supposed to be a smaller new Chevrolet. GM was developing a new mid-sized automobile that would become the 1964 Chevelle. But to Chrysler's shock and dismay, Chevrolet's 1962 full-size lineup emerged slightly larger than the 1961 models, with the mid-range Chevrolet Bel Air (on a  wheelbase) growing a  longer in its body, although the car weighed  less than its 1961 predecessor. The rumored "small Chevrolet" turned out to be the new A-body Chevrolet Chevelle mid-sized platform, which was intended to bolster Chevy's position where the Corvair had faltered in that segment of the market. 

The "full-size" Dodge Polara and Dart that emerged for 1962 were built on a  shorter wheelbase and were  shorter overall than the comparable Chevrolet, placing Dodge in the precarious position with consumers of not offering a true full-sized automobile. Ford also brought their new intermediate- or mid-size Ford Fairlane and Mercury Meteor to market for 1962 with a  wheelbase ( on all Meteors but wagons). They were roughly the same size as the new standard-size Dodges, which made the new Mopars intermediates by default. The AMC Rambler was also similarly sized and was introduced to North America in 1961.

Compounding the size issue were the designs themselves, which did not translate well from their full-size origins to what amounted to intermediate size. The proposed curved side glass was deleted in favor of flat glass, which did not match the curve of the body sides. They also reduced the total glass area, which made the cars look smaller.

An unpopular design for the second year in a row, the 1961 models had awkward-looking "reversed" tailfins and a pinched grille, among other unusual features.  This combined with the cars' smaller overall size threatened Dodge's viability enough that Chrysler was forced to move immediately to stem Dodge's financial and market share losses.

Model years

1962

Without lead time sufficient to develop an all new full-sized Dodge, Chrysler approved the sharing of the full-size body used by the Chrysler Newport and the non-letter 300 series. The models were differentiated by mating a modified 1961 Dodge Polara front clip to the Newport's de-finned rear quarter panels and passenger compartment. Since the 1962 Newport sedans had themselves been created by mating a modified 1961 Newport front clip to the de-finned bodies of 1961 Dodge Polaras, this meant that the 1962 Custom 880 was essentially the reunion of the front and rear ends of the 1961 Dodge Polara, updated for 1962 by way of the 1962 Newport. A similar process was used to produce the 1962 Custom 880 wagon, except the wagon was created by mating the updated front end of a 1961 Polara to the body of a 1961 full-sized Plymouth wagon. This body sharing allowed Dodge to launch the car in January 1962. It was fitted with a   V8 engine from the B family; there were no optional engines.

The only visible cue at the front of the car that was different from the 1961 Dodge was the addition of a horizontal bar across the grille, bisected by Dodge’s new three-pointed "Fratzog" emblem in place of the stylized star bar from the 1961 Polara. From the rear, the 1962 Custom 880 was identical to the Chrysler Newport except for Dodge badging.

The model name Custom 880 was derived from Dodge’s numerical sub-model naming structure that was also used on the Dart and sportier models of the Polara, although the model designation was not physically present on the car. Only "Dodge" badges on the rear quarter panels and decklid of the car were applied. A six-way power seat was optional.

For the short 1962 run, the Custom 880 was available as a four-door sedan, two- or four-door hardtop, a two-door convertible, as well as in six- or nine-passenger station wagons that featured the Chrysler hardtop (no center or B-pillar) body design.

Custom 880 production totaled 17,500 for the 1962 model year.

1963

For 1963, the Custom 880 series included a new base model, simply named  the 880, available only as a pillared four-door sedan or a station wagon. Chrysler-branded cars were redesigned for 1963, leaving the 880's body unique to Dodge, although the car was still produced alongside the now totally different Chrysler. There was also an optional engine, the   two-barrel V8.

In what must have been near-record time, Dodge designers created an entirely new look for the car ahead of the cowl, fronted by a new convex grille in the shape of a very long oval, which shared visual similarities with the AMC Rambler. Straighter front fenders flanked a hood with a depressed central section featuring the Dodge name in block letters above the grille. Designers cleverly integrated the new Chrysler's front bumper into the design as well.

At the rear there was less change, although the car received restyled taillights. Set in heavy chromed housings, they were mounted to the carryover quarter panels and imparted a Dodge familial appearance to the rear, as one of Dodge's styling hallmarks of the time was round taillights.

The new base-model 880 station wagons utilized the pillared body in both six- and nine-passenger models, while the Custom-series wagons featured the pillarless hardtop design. With Chrysler no longer using the body and its interior trim elements, Custom 880s were better appointed than they had been during the 1962 model year.

A total of 28,200 vehicles were produced for 1963, of which 5,600 were station wagons.

1964

The 880 and Custom 880 received their most significant and final redesign of the 1960 body for 1964. This time, the rear body contours were squared up somewhat, with new decklids, wraparound rectangular taillights, and new quarter panels. Four-door models received a new roofline, although this was actually the same as had been used on the Chrysler New Yorker until 1962. Regardless, it did impart a fresh appearance. The grille was also updated, this time featuring a concave design with a central horizontal break spanning the distance between the headlights.

Custom 880s received stainless steel rocker panel trim, foam-padded seats, and a grooved stainless steel panel that spanned the distance between the taillights. The Customs, as the top of the 880 line, also received better interior appointments than the base models. The engines remained as they had been in 1963.

Because of tooling expenses, station wagon bodies — which were also shared with Chrysler models — did not receive all of the changes applied to non-wagon models. Most notably, wagons continued to feature the heavy rear horizontal blade stamping first seen on the 1961 Plymouth wagons. The station wagons continued in both pillared (880) and hardtop (Custom 880) models, although this would be the final year for the hardtop wagon — Dodge and Chrysler being the last American automotive brands to offer the style. Station wagons also received rectangular taillights that wrapped around the sides of the vehicle.

All 880s and Custom 880s received a revised instrument cluster layout, replacing the previous design which had been in use with little change since 1961. An oil pressure gauge was standard. Front leg room was 41.9 inches.

The 880 and Custom 880 received favorable press reviews, especially for their redesign. Sales for 1964 totaled 31,800 vehicles, a record for the model.

1965
The 1965 model year cars were the first that fully incorporated Elwood Engel's influence on Chrysler's corporate overall design themes, although he had joined the company in 1961. Gone were the relatively extreme curves and angles that were a legacy from the final Virgil Exner-styled cars. Engel's design philosophy, which was encouraged by Chrysler chairman Lynn Townsend, took Chrysler's products in the direction of rectilinear geometric angles; rectangular and trapezoidal shapes dominated Dodge's fullsize designs for the year.

The introductions of the 1965 models also allowed Chrysler to rectify its 1962 mistake and reintroduced a full-sized Dodge Polara to the public. The "new" Polara took the position formerly held by the 880, with the Custom 880 taking the top trim level. The luxurious new Dodge Monaco, which was available only as a two-door hardtop, was the top-of-the-line model produced by Dodge in 1965 and was designed to compete against the Ford Galaxie 500 LTD and Chevrolet Caprice, both new top-line luxury models for 1965. An AM/FM radio and a 7-position tilt steering wheel were optional.

All big Dodges, 880, Monaco, and Polara, now featured the same body and styling. Gone was the 1961 Chrysler design. All Custom 880s came with the standard features found in the Polara and added foam-padded seats and stainless steel window frames on station wagons and sedans. Hardtops and convertibles featured all-vinyl interiors. Custom 880s also featured a pillared six-window "town sedan" body that was unavailable in the Polara series. The series also featured the first Dodge-brand "wood" trimmed station wagon since the early 1950s, a look achieved through the use of DI-NOC appliqué framed in stainless steel trim. A total of 23,700 Custom 880s, all with V8 engines, were built during the model year.

The 361 V8 was replaced by a  version of the 383. There was also an optional   RB V8, and at the top of the line the   Wedge V8, also available with a four-speed manual transmission.

Discontinuation
Dodge discontinued the Custom 880 nameplate at the end of the 1965 model year in the United States. In an effort to move its top full-size series upscale for 1966, the division adopted the Monaco name for all of the former Custom 880 models, with the exception of the six-window sedan, which was discontinued. The original Monaco hardtop added the 500 label for 1966, and was still promoted as a competitor to the Pontiac Grand Prix.

Production figures
Combined Dodge 880 and Custom 880 annual production figures rounded to the nearest 100:

 1962, 17,500
 1963, 28,200
 1964, 31,800
 1965, 23,700
 Total: 101,200

References

 

Custom 880
Full-size vehicles
Rear-wheel-drive vehicles
Station wagons
Convertibles
Coupés
Sedans
Cars introduced in 1962
Cars discontinued in 1965